TagAZ was an automotive assembly plant located in Taganrog, Russia. An affiliated enterprise is the Rostov Truck Factory.

On January 21, 2014, the company was declared bankrupt.

History 
Construction of the Taganrog Automotive Plant began in spring 1997, under license and technology of South Korean Daewoo Motors, and was fully financed by Doninvest Finance & Industry Group, with investment volumes surpassing US$260 million. In 1998, Doninvest launched pilot semi-knocked-down production of the Daewoo Lanos and Daewoo Nubira models.

From 1999 to 2002, the company assembled the Citroën Berlingo Mk I model under the name Orion M.

In 2001, it started producing the Hyundai Accent (LC), followed in 2004 by the Hyundai Sonata (EF), in 2008 by the Hyundai Elantra (XD), and in 2005 by the Hyundai Porter (third generation) light truck. In 2008, it started production of the Hyundai Santa Fe (SM). In the spring of 2012, production of the Hyundai models was over.

In 2008, it began assembly from semi-knocked-down kits of the Vortex Estina (a rebadged Chery A5).

In 2010, TagAZ announced the construction of a third automotive manufacturing plant in Bangladesh, with an initial $2 billion investment. According to TagAZ officials, the decision to build cars in Bangladesh was made because of its low labour costs and the export advantages it enjoys with neighbouring countries and Europe. TagAZ had already purchased land in the Kishoreganj District and aimed to sell the first car assembled there by 2012.

In October 2010, TagAZ started assembling the BYD F3, Vortex Corda (a modified Chery Amulet), and Vortex Tingo (modified Chery Tiggo) models.

In June 2011, the company began assembly from complete-knocked-down kits of the Tagaz C10 (a rebadged version of the JAC Tojoy). In October 2011, the Tagaz C190 (a rebadged version of the JAC Rein) was added to the line-up.

At one point, the company reached the capacity to simultaneously produce up to 20 different models at its facilities.

Owners and executives 
TagAZ's owner was Russian entrepreneur M. Y. Paramonov, CEO of the financial-industrial Doninvest group. One-fifth of TagAZ shares were held by Sapor Invest Inc., Ikaria International Technologies Aktiengesellschaft, Pemberton Establishment, Asha Holding, and Dl Technologies GmbH.

Production capacity 
The TagAZ factory at Taganrog covers an area of 60,000 m2 and is divided into 5 departments:

 Welding body shop
 Paint shop
 Assembly shop (4 lines)
 Electroplating shop
 Functional testing shop

The conveyor line is laid out vertically over four floors of the main plant building, with a network of elevators and lifts linking the different levels. Each level is equipped with a monorail as well as compact lifting and transporting equipment.

All completed vehicles undergo a road test on a track made up of varied road surfaces.

Performance 
The current yearly production regime is 180,000 units of six different vehicle models.

Model lineup

TagAZ-owned brands 
Over its lifetime TagAZ used three different brands:

Doninvest
Under the brand Doninvest (licensed copies of Daewoo )
 Doninvest Kondor (Daewoo Leganza)
 Doninvest Orion (Daewoo Nubira)
 Doninvest Assol (Daewoo Lanos)
 Doninvest Aksaj Dozor (buggy based on Lada Niva)

Vortex

Vortex (rebadged Chery)
 Vortex Estina, rebadged from the Chery A5
 Vortex Estina FL-C, rebadged from the Chery E5
 Vortex Corda, rebadged from the Chery Amulet
 Vortex Tingo, rebadged from the Chery Tiggo

TagAZ
TagAZ
 TagAZ Tager, rebadged from the SsangYong Korando
 TagAZ Road Partner, rebadged from the SsangYong Musso
 TagAZ C10, rebadged from the JAC Tojoy
 TagAZ C190, rebadged from the JAC Rein
 TagAZ Aquila
 2009–2012 TagAZ Vega - this claimed own development was accused of being a copy of the Chevrolet Lacetti; as a result TagAZ lost the rights to export the Vega and their joint venture with Ssangyong was dissolved
 TagAZ Master
 TagAZ Hardy light truck

TagAZ produced foreign brands
TagAZ assembled the following foreign brands from knock-down kits:

Hyundai brand 
 Hyundai Accent LC
 Hyundai Sonata EF
 Hyundai Porter III
 Hyundai Elantra XD
 Hyundai Santa Fe SM
 Hyundai County
 Hyundai Trago Xcient

BYD brand 
 BYD F3

Notes

References

External links 
 Official website (archived)

Vehicle manufacturing companies established in 1997
Defunct motor vehicle manufacturers of Russia
Vehicle manufacturing companies disestablished in 2014
Companies based in Rostov Oblast